In India, an Inter State Bus Terminal or Inter-State Bus Terminus (ISBT) is a bus terminus that provides bus service to destinations located in other states. An ISBT may also provide bus services to destinations in the same state. Mostly ISBT Term is used in the Northern Part of India, In the western part of India, ST Stand or State Transport Term is used.

Andhra Pradesh

 Pandit Nehru bus station, Vijayawada
 APSRTC complex Inter-State Bus Terminus, Visakhapatnam
 Srihari Inter-State Bus Terminus, Tirupati
 NTR Inter-State Bus Terminus, Guntur

Assam

 Rupnath Brahma Inter State Bus Terminus, Guwahati
 Inter-State Bus Terminus, Jorhat
 Inter-State Bus Terminus, Silchar

Bihar
Pataliputra Inter State Bus Terminus, Patna

Chandigarh 

 Inter State Bus Terminal Sector 17 (ISBT-17)
 Inter State Bus Terminal Sector 43 (ISBT-43)

Chhattisgarh

 Sri Balaji Swami Trust Sri Dudhadhari Math Inter State Bus Terminal (ISBT), Raipur
 Hi-tech Bus Terminus Bilaspur

Delhi
In Delhi, the major Inter-State Bus Terminals operated by Delhi Transport Infrastructure Development Corporation Limited (DTIDC) include:

 Maharana Pratap Inter State Bus Terminus, Kashmiri Gate, caters to North and Central Delhi
 Veer Hakikat Rai Inter State Bus Terminus, Sarai Kale Khan, Caters to West and South Delhi
 Swami Vivekanand Inter State Bus Terminus, Anand Vihar, caters to East Delhi
 Rohini District Court- caters to the districts of North and North-West Delhi
 Tis Hazari District Court- caters to the districts of Central and West Delhi
 Patiala House District Court- caters to the district of New Delhi
 Aanand Vihar District Court- caters to the districts of Shahdara, East and North-East Delhi
 Pushp Vihar District Court- caters to the districts of South and South-East Delhi
 Dwarka District Court- caters to the district of South-West Delhi
 ITO District Court- caters to the CBI, NCB and EB related cases of Delhi

Jharkhand

 Birsa Munda Bus Terminal, Ranchi
 Dhanbad Bus Stand, Dhanbad
 Mango Bus Stand, Jamshedpur

Karnataka

 Kempegowda Bus Station (Majestic Bus Station), Bangalore
 Mysore Road Satellite Bus Station, Bangalore
 Atal Bihari Vajpayee Traffic and Transit Management Centre, Bangalore

Madhya Pradesh

 Kushabhau Thakre Inter State Bus Terminal, Bhopal
 ISBT, Jabalpur, Jabalpur
 Nana Kheda Inter State Bus Terminal, Ujjain
 Shaheed Raja Bhau Mahakal Bus Stand, Ujjain
 Sarwate Inter State Bus Terminal, Indore
 Navlakha Inter State Bus Terminal, Indore
 Gangwal Inter State Bus Terminal, Indore

Maharashtra

 Pimpri-Chinchwad Bus Stand, Pimpri-Chinchwad
 Pune Station Bus Stand, Pune
 Shivajinagar Bus Station, Shivajinagar
 Swargate Bus Station, Swargate

Odisha

 Inter-State Bus Terminal, Baramunda, Bhubaneswar
 Inter State Bus Terminal (ISBT), Badambadi, Cuttack
 Cuttack Netaji Bus Terminal (CNBT)

Punjab

 Shaheed Madan Lal Dhingra Inter State Bus Terminal, Amritsar
 Shaheed-e-Azam Bhagat Singh Inter State Bus Terminal, Jalandhar
 Bhagwan Valmiki Inter State Bus Terminal, Hoshiarpur
 Amar Shaheed Sukhdev Inter State Bus Terminal, Ludhiana
 Baba Banda Singh Bahadur Inter State Bus Terminal, Mohali

Rajasthan

 Hindaun City Bus Depot, Hindaun
 Sikar Bus Depot, Sikar
 Sindhi Camp, Jaipur
 Jodhpur Bus Stand, Jodhpur
 Udaipur City Bus Depot, Udaipur

Tamil Nadu

 Chennai Mofussil Bus Terminus
At , the Chennai Mofussil Bus Terminus in Chennai, India, is the largest bus station in Asia. As of 2010, the terminus handled more than 500 buses at a time, and 3,000 buses and 250,000 passengers a day.

Telangana

 Mahatma Gandhi Bus Station, Hyderabad
 Jubilee Bus Station, Secunderabad
 Nizamabad bus station, Nizamabad

Uttarakhand

 Inter-State Bus Terminal, Almora Almora
 Inter-State Bus Terminal, Dehradun (Hill Bus Depot), Dehradun
 Inter-State Bus Terminal, Haldwani Haldwani
 Inter-State Bus Terminal, Haridwar, Haridwar
 Inter-State Bus Terminal, Rishikesh, Rishikesh
 Inter-State Bus Terminal, Rudrapur Rudrapur

Uttar Pradesh 

 Idgah Bus Stand, Agra
 Inter State Bus Terminal (Agra ISBT), Agra
 Faizabad Bus Depot

West Bengal 

 International Bus Terminus, Kolkata
 Karunamoyee Bus Terminal, Kolkata
 Babughat Bus Stand, Kolkata
 Tenzing Norgay Bus Terminus, Siliguri

State government bus 
Many Indian state governments have their own fleet of buses which are run under their state transport department. As per statistics, the State Road Transport Undertakings (STUs) altogether operates 1,50,000 buses. State-wise bus fleet is as follows

Government city buses 
Many Indian cities have local public city bus services. Here is a list of fleet of government city buses operated as of now in India cities (million plus population).

References
 Chris Devonshire-Ellis. Doing Business in India. Springer, Apr 12, 2012 pg. 127

Specific

Bus-related lists
Bus stations in India